Tunku Abdul Rahman ibni Al-Marhum Sultan Ismail Al-Khalidi (25 November 1933 – 12 July 1989) was the younger son of Sultan Ismail of Johor as well as the younger brother of Sultan Iskandar of Johor. Abdul Rahman held the post of Tunku Mahkota (or Crown Prince) for twenty years until shortly before his father's death in 1981. His termination of his post generated considerable controversy for a brief period of time.

Succession crisis
Abdul Rahman was appointed Tunku Mahkota of Johor by his father, Sultan Ismail on 10 August 1961, after his brother, Tunku Iskandar (later Sultan Iskandar) was disinherited from the post on grounds of alleged misbehaviour. Five years later in December 1966, Tunku Iskandar was appointed as the Raja Muda at the request of their Sultan Ismail and was approved by the Council of Royal Court, and placing him second in line to the royal throne behind Tunku Abdul Rahman. On 29 April 1981, as Sultan Ismail lay ill on his deathbed, Tunku Iskandar was appointed Tunku Mahkota in favour of him.

The decision took many people by surprise, including the then-Menteri Besar of Johor, Othman Saat who promptly criticised the Sultan's actions, and earning the wrath of Tunku Iskandar at the same time. Abdul Rahman, on the other hand, decided to remain silent initially but later took his grievances to his press and expressed his shock and disappointment over his father's decision, suggesting that he had done nothing wrong in the twenty years as the Tunku Mahkota and also cited some of his significant contributions to the state during his tenure.

Later life
After the succession crisis, Abdul Rahman reverted to his old post of Tunku Bendahara, a post which he once briefly held from 1959-1961. Abdul Rahman, by now in ailing health, held that post until his death in 1989. In his later years, his health, already plagued by diabetes, worsened, which ultimately saw one of his legs being amputated.

After his death, the post of Tunku Bendahara was passed down to Sultan Iskandar's younger son, Tunku Abdul Majid.

Honours
  :
  Second Class of the Royal Family Order of Johor (DK II) (1959) 
  First Class of the Royal Family Order of Johor (DK I) (1962)
  Knight Grand Commander of the Order of the Crown of Johor (SPMJ) – Dato' (1964)
  :
  Grand Knight of the Order of Cura Si Manja Kini (SPCM) – Dato’ Seri (1971)

Notes

References

 
 
 
 
 
 
 
 

1933 births
1989 deaths
Deaths from diabetes
Heirs apparent who never acceded
House of Temenggong of Johor
Malaysian people of Malay descent
Malaysian Muslims
People from Johor
First Classes of the Royal Family Order of Johor
Second Classes of the Royal Family Order of Johor
Knights Grand Commander of the Order of the Crown of Johor
Sons of monarchs